Holosiivska Street is a street located in Holosiivskyi District of Kyiv, Ukraine. It runs from Nauky Avenue to Holosiivska Square and Holosiivskyi National Nature Park, and is named for the latter.

Holosiivska Street was built in the 19th century. It continued into the forest until the mid of 20th century. In 1970s the street was reconstructed.

During Russian invasion of Ukraine in 2022 and Battle of Kyiv, Holosiivska street suffered air strikes.

Notable buildings 
 Lyceum Nr. 241 
 Police department of Holosiivsky District.
 Teatralny Hotel .

Transport 
Metro stations located near Holossivska street are Holosiivska and Demiivska.

References

Sources 
 Holosiivska Street on wek.kiev.ua (in Ukrainian)
 Голосіївська вулиця // Вулиці Києва. Довідник / за ред. А. В. Кудрицького. — К. : «Українська енциклопедія» ім. М. П. Бажана, 1995. — С. 53. — ISBN 5-88500-070-0. (in Ukrainian)

Streets in Kyiv
Holosiivskyi District